The American Interest (AI) was a bimonthly magazine focusing primarily on foreign policy, international affairs, global economics, and military matters.

History 
The magazine was founded in 2005 by a number of members of the editorial board of The National Interest, led by Francis Fukuyama, who opposed changes to that journal's editorial policy implemented by its new publisher, the Nixon Center.

Several people formerly associated with The National Interest have been associated with The American Interest, including former National Interest editor Adam Garfinkle (the founding editor of The American Interest); Fukuyama, who serves as chairman of the journal's executive committee; Ruth Wedgwood, formerly a National Interest advisory council member and now an American Interest editorial board member; and Thomas M. Rickers, formerly the managing editor of The National Interest. In October 2018, Jeffrey Gedmin was appointed Editor-in-Chief.

Hiatus 

As of 2 October 2020, it announced that ""due primarily to financing difficulties" it was "taking a hiatus from publishing new material". Selected articles were kept available free online.

Reception 
Writing in The American Prospect, Robert S. Boynton commented that "The American Interest represents a new and fascinating sun in the expanding galaxy of opponents of Bush administration policy."

Prominent contributors 
Contributors to the journal were predominantly established (rather than up-and-coming) commentators known for their expertise in international affairs, global strategy, and military matters. In addition to Fukuyama, Garfinkle, and other magazine staffers, the major contributors included:

 Andrew J. Bacevich
 Stephen Biddle
 Diane Francis
 Niall Ferguson
 John Lewis Gaddis
 Mary R. Habeck
 Robert D. Kaplan
 Bernard-Henri Lévy
 Walter Russell Mead
 Andrew A. Michta
 Ralph Peters
 Robert Reich
 Dov Zakheim
 Josef Joffe
 William Galston

See also 
 Current History
 Foreign Affairs
 Foreign Policy

References

External links 

 The American Interest website

2005 establishments in Washington, D.C.
Bimonthly magazines published in the United States
Conservative magazines published in the United States
International relations journals
Magazines established in 2005
Magazines published in Washington, D.C.